Charles Robert Norris Mackie (30 April 1869–15 October 1943) was a New Zealand pacifist and social reformer. He was born in Avonside, North Canterbury, New Zealand on 30 April 1869.

References

1869 births
1943 deaths
People from Christchurch
New Zealand pacifists